Madura Station also known as Madura Plains is a pastoral lease and sheep station located about  east south east of Kalgoorlie in the Goldfields-Esperance region  of Western Australia. It is within the locality of Madura and the Eyre Highway runs along the boundary of the station.

Description
It is the second largest sheep station in Australia, after Rawlinna and is currently owned by CC Cooper & Co.

In 1927, the extent of the Madura Station was reported as two million acres.

The station has a carrying capacity of 58,000 sheep, which are merinos raised for their wool. The company employed eight staff in 2012 working under the supervision of the station manager, Matt Haines.

The land is mostly gently undulating calcareous plains with eucalypt–melaleuca–myall woodlands and chenopod shrubland interspersed with saltbush shrubland and bindii grassland. Many caves can be found amongst the limestone bedrock of the Nullarbor Plain.

History
The traditional owners of the area are the Mirning people, whose territory stretched across the Nullarbor and into South Australia.

Europeans settled the area in 1876 to breed horses, which were sent to India to be used by the British Army. The first recorded lease encompassing the old homestead was by G.Heinzmann for a period of one year; the lease was not renewed for 1878.

The station underwent significant improvements through 1884, including the addition of fencing and water tanks. Bores were sunk and brackish water was found and then drilled through in the hope of finding permanent freshwater.

The property included a good homestead and a well provisioned store. The property had been recently depastured and was only carrying 800 merino ewes and a few horses.

The Ponton brothers and John Sharp were the next to take up the lease, in 1898, when the property was known as Clifton Downs Station.

A rabbit plague swept through the area and continued westward in 1901. William Ponton reported that millions of rabbits were already between Eucla and Nullarbor.

Shortly afterwards Mr A. J. Talbot took over the property, along with Mundrabilla Station. Talbot was also raising mostly cattle along with horses as well as a small herd of camels at Madura. Cattle from Madura were routinely being overlanded to the Kalgoorlie saleyards.

In 1927 the Madura Pastoral and Settlement Company successfully acquired 5 million acres around Madura Station with the intention of developing it for settlement. The company wanted the federal government to spend £100,000 on dog-proof fencing and water boring to make over 15 million acres of land able to carry an additional one million sheep that would be able to produce an additional 30,000 bales of wool. The station changed hands at some point around the same time and was owned by Charles Bowen from 1927 to 1932 when he became ill and was no longer able to operate the rationing depot for the department of Aboriginal Protection.

Several hundred brumbies were roaming Madura station in 1933 along with a substantial herd of wild cattle. The station owners erected trap and stockyards at an artesian bore that had been flowing continuously for 28 years. Other men from the district had come and had caught over 300 of the horses, which were taken and sold. The bore was also a stopping place for overlanders with the warm water making it a popular bathing place.

The area experienced heavy rains in 1934 resulting in boggy roads under  of water.

The station manager, Mr W O'Donovan had to be evacuated by an emergency flight by Goldfields Airways using a new Fox Moth airplane when he was dangerously ill in 1935. A doctor was on board and O'Donovan was flown to Kalgoorlie for treatment. O'Donovan died the following day as a result of an internal haemorrhage.

The acting manager and former stockman, Michael O'Brien, was charged with cattle stealing in 1937. O'Brien had taken 102 cattle to Loongana and put another brand on them before selling them, he defended himself saying that the Melbourne based company had not paid him any wages since the death of O'Donovan.

In 1939 flooding occurred in areas around the station and Madura recorded  of rain, filling dams and weirs. Strong winds blew down many trees causing problems on roads in the area.

The station had been the target of thieves and vandals in 1940 prompting the station owner's wife to carry a revolver whenever her husband was away. Sign-posts and water tanks had been damaged, articles had been stolen and even the homestead had been burnt down by a party of overlanders. The manager at the time, Robert Mackie, was often away overlanding himself and often reported on the road conditions in the area, particularly the Madura Pass.

Mackie reported  of the pass being washed away, making it impossible for even camels to traverse.

They fled into the bush but were found by Aboriginal trackers and apprehended by police.

The station was gripped by drought in 1948 with 400 cattle dying as a result of lack of feed. The remaining herd of about 500 was to be driven to Loongana to look for feed and water.

Rumours were rife in the press that the station had been abandoned in 1949, after several travellers found dead crows and rabbits around the homestead. Mackie denied the claims, saying he was in Kalgoorlie for an extended business trip. Later the same year the Reverend Sopher, his wife and five children arrived at Madura to set up a home and school for Aboriginal children under the auspices of the Australian Aborigines Evangelistal Mission. A few months later Mrs Sopher was badly burnt when a spark from the oven set her dress alight; she then had to endure the long trip to Norseman hospital for treatment.
In 1950 the mission was issued a writ claiming damages for breach of contract on behalf of Madura Ltd concerning the sale of the station to the mission. Later the same year Mackie began to convert the homestead into a stopping place following six years of drought. Although some heavy rains had fallen they were too far apart to be of any use and the station had virtually no stock left on it. Petrol pumps were installed and the homestead was converted to a motel-hotel, with a  liquor licence granted later the same year.

Mackie was taken to hospital in 1951 with heart troubles and the station was sold later the same year to a group of developers who were to turn the area into a tourist resort.

In the 1960s the Birmingham family (Charlie Carter's grocery chain) held the lease, and the station manager was Brian O'Connor - brother of the politician Ray O'Connor.

The Jumbuck Pastoral Company acquired Madura in 1987, adding it to the neighbouring Moonera and began sub-dividing large paddocks and installing extra windmills and water points. Matt Haines was appointed manager in 2011; in the same year 30,000 sheep were shorn producing 850 bales of wool. This followed a good season where the property received  of rain, nearly double the annual average.

In 2012 a fire burned for three days near Madura, covering the Eyre Highway in smoke. Over  of bushland was consumed by the blaze.

Madura Plains Station was purchased by CC Cooper & Co, Jamestown, South Australia from Jumbuck Pastoral in February 2016 for 10 million.

See also
 List of ranches and stations
List of the largest stations in Australia

References

Pastoral leases in Western Australia
Goldfields-Esperance
Stations (Australian agriculture)
Nullarbor Plain